Damiën Hertog (born December 3, 1974) is a Dutch footballer who played for Excelsior Rotterdam before retiring in 2008. His former clubs are RBC Roosendaal and De Graafschap.

Coaching career
From 2008 to 2009, Hertog worked as a scout, analyst and coach for various clubs. He then became manager of Excelsior Maassluis for the 2010/11 season. But in June 2010 Feyenoord announced, that Hertog from the next summer (2011), would be the manager of the club's U19 team. From the summer 2013, he became academy manager of Feyenoord which he was until June 2016, where he returned as U19 manager.

In June 2017 it was announced that Hertog would be appointed to be the assistant coach of Mario Been at APOEL FC. Been and Hertog were dismissed by APOEL after only two months in charge.

In the summer 2018, Hertog joined Al Jazira Club in Abu Dhabi as assistant manager of Marcel Keizer. However, Keizer left the club in November 2018 to become manager of Sporting CP, and Hertog took his place as manager of Jazira. He left the club at the end of the season.

On 28 August 2019, Hertog was appointed manager of the Saudi Arabian U21 national team. The Saudi football association confirmed on 16 January 2022, that they had parted ways with Hertog.

References
 Profile

1974 births
Living people
Dutch footballers
Directors of football clubs in the Netherlands
Excelsior Rotterdam players
RBC Roosendaal players
De Graafschap players
Eredivisie players
Eerste Divisie players
Footballers from Rotterdam
Association football midfielders
Dutch expatriate football managers
UAE Pro League managers
VV Zwaluwen players